Robert Milligan (born 1952) is a British rower who competed for Great Britain.

Rowing career
Milligan was part of the eight that reached the final and finished 5th, at the 1977 World Rowing Championships in Amsterdam.

He rowed in the 2019 World Masters Regatta and won the 2016 World Masters single scull, rowing Poplar Blackwall and District Rowing Club.

References

1952 births
Living people
British male rowers
Masters rowers